Parkside Studio College is a studio school connected with Rosedale and Hewens College in Hayes, Greater London.

Students who attend Parkside gain qualifications in key subjects such as English, Mathematics and Science. They also study Information and Communications Technology, Business Studies and one of six specialist pathways.

Parkside places emphasis on a practical approach: students work on placement in their elected pathway area and are taught to develop employability skills.

Standards
In 2017 the school was judged by Ofsted as Requiring Improvement.

References

External links
 Parkside Studio College official website

Secondary schools in the London Borough of Hillingdon
Studio schools
Educational institutions established in 2012
2012 establishments in England